Søren Ulrik Thomsen (born 8 May 1956) is a Danish poet. His debut was City Slang, 1981.

Life
Søren Ulrik Thomsen was born in 1956 in Kalundborg. He grew up in Store Heddinge, Stevns, south of Copenhagen, where he went to school together with another Danish poet, Jens Fink-Jensen from 1968 to 1972. During his childhood he often heard readings of literature and sang evening songs. This early exposure to the rhythm and poetry of language influenced his later writing. In school he became familiar with the songs of B.S.Ingemann, a poet who has had significant influence on Thomsen's poetry.
 
He moved with his family to Copenhagen at sixteen and enrolled in secondary school at Rysensteen and, after being expelled, at Det Frie Gymnasium, where he completed his upper secondary education, making him eligible for university studies. His encounter with Copenhagen influenced his early poetry, and was reflected in themes such as the strangeness and loneliness of the big city. 
 
Søren Ulrik Thomsen studied comparative literature at the University of Copenhagen, but prioritized writing poetry rather than completing his degree. His debut was in the review Hvedekorn (Wheatgrain) in 1977.

Publishing and style
His first collection of poetry was City Slang (1981; this and other links to years are to the corresponding "[year]-in-poetry" articles). It is poetry about human alienation in a city. In 1984, the Danish singer Lars H.U.G. scored these poems on an album of the same title, expanding Thomsen's audience.
 
Thomsen's collections of poetry City Slang, Ukendt under den samme måne ("Unknown Under the Same Moon"; 1982) and New poems (1987) belonged to the group of 80s poets who were reacting against the political poets of the seventies. The 80s poets, which included Michael Strunge, was focused on the body, sensations, and existential subjects in a tight, minimalistic language. 
 
Later Thomsen published Hjemfalden (1991), Det skabtes vaklen ("The Shaking of Creation", 1996) and Det værste og det bedste, illustrated by Ib Spang Olsen, (2002). With these collections he moved away from the school 80s poets and establishes himself as a poet with a truly individual expression.
 
Søren Ulrik Thomsen is interested in great existential human conditions such as death and loneliness, creation and destruction. His poems in Hjemfalden are rhythmic arabesques, which comes through strongly in his public readings. 
 
He has also published two poetics, where he tries to define the essence of poetry and what happens in the process of creating a poem, Mit lys brænder. Omrids af en ny poetik ("In My Candle Burns: Outline of a New Poetics", 1985) and En dans på gloser, essays ("Dancing Attendance on the Word," 1996). 
 
As a writer Søren Ulrik Thomsen also participates in public debate and has published a book of essays with Frederik Stjernfeldt, Kritik af den negative opbyggelighed. His books have always enjoyed a great deal of attention as the subject of numerous books and essays, and he is seen as one of the more significant Danish contemporary poets. He was the focus of the only conference (as of 2009) ever devoted to a living Danish writer.

Søren Ulrik Thomsen's poetry has been translated in the book Selected Poetry, based on poems from Hjemfalden and Det skabtes vaklen.

Awards 

 1985 – Otto Gelsted Prize
 2015 – Søren Gyldendal Prize

References

21st-century Danish poets
Danish male poets
University of Copenhagen alumni
People from Kalundborg
1956 births
Living people
20th-century Danish poets
20th-century Danish male writers
21st-century Danish male writers